Italian billiards may refer to:

Five-pin billiards or five-pins, a now internationally standardized cue sport
Goriziana a.k.a. nine-pin billiards or nine-pins, a more complicated derivative of five-pin billiards
Cue sports (billiards-type games) in Italian sport generally